The 2011 PBA Commissioner's Cup Finals was the best-of-7 championship series of the Philippine Basketball Association (PBA) 2011 Commissioner's Cup, and the conclusion of the conference's playoffs. The Talk 'N Text Tropang Texters and the Barangay Ginebra Kings played for the 102nd championship contested by the league.

The Tropang Texters qualified to the playoffs after finishing the elimination round with the #1 seed and a bye up to the semifinals, suffering only one defeat, against Smart Gilas national team in their conference opener. In the semifinals they defeated the Air21 Express in three consecutive games. The Kings on the other hand, finished third and had to beat the Rain or Shine Elasto Painters in the quarterfinals in order to meet Smart Gilas in the semifinals. The Kings defeated #2 seed Smart Gilas in four games to qualify for the Finals.

In the Finals, the Tropang Texters blew the game wide open in the third quarter after a tightly contested first half to lead the series 1–0. The Kings won Game 2 in a tight contest to tie the series, but the Tropang Texters won comfortably at Puerto Princesa to regain the series lead. Back in Metro Manila, the Tropang Texters won Game 4 after trailing by as much 17 points to move within a win away from the championship, but the Kings won Game 5 to extend the series. In a tightly contested Game 6, Talk 'N Text needed an overtime period to eliminate Ginebra to win their second consecutive PBA championship.

Background

Road to the finals

Series summary
*overtime

Game 1

Ginebra led early in the first quarter, erecting a 16–6 lead but Talk 'N Text scored on a 15–4 run to lead in the first quarter by one point. The Tropang Texters then had another 15–5 run gave them a 39–29 advantage but Ginebra made their own run at the final minutes of the second quarter, capped off by a three-point buzzer-beater by Mark Caguioa to put the Kings up by one point at halftime. At the start of the third quarter, Talk 'N Text limited the Kings to two field goals and scored 14 points to lead by nine points. Talk 'N Text's bench scored 39 points to prevent another Ginebra run to close out the game, with the Tropang Texters leading by as much as 22 at some point.

Game 2

Talk 'N Text led early in the game with Paul Harris, Ryan Reyes and Jayson Castro outscoring the entire Ginebra team 30–15 in the first quarter. Robert Labagala and John Wilson scored on hustle plays in the second quarter to give Ginebra the lead 47–46. In the third quarter, Ronald Tubid and Talk 'N Text assistant coach Aboy Castro had a verbal altercation but were separated after Tubid gave Jimmy Alapag a hard foul; Ranidel de Ocampo later scored a three-point shot to tie the game at 71–all. Wilson scored 16 points in the game, including a key three-point play in a Ginebra 9-point run to give them the lead 108–101. Talk 'N Text made a final run and had a chance to win the game, but Alapag missed his three-point shot as time expired.

Game 3

Ranidel de Ocampo scored two consecutive three-point shots to give Talk 'N Text a 57–49 lead at halftime. While Caguioa led Ginebra into tying the game at 47–all, De Ocampo, Alapag and Larry Fonacier scored on five more three-point shots to extend Talk 'N Text's lead; Alapag's last three-pointer extended the Tropang Texters' lead to 12 points with 3:49 left in the game. Harvey Carey and Castro scored against the Ginebra defense to give the Tropang Texters an unassailable 18-point lead.

Game 4

Ginebra erected a 49–36 lead at halftime then extended it to a 55–38 lead early in the third quarter after a JC Intal three-point shot with 10:44 left in the third quarter. Talk 'N Text then had a 24–7 run led by Harris, de Ocampo and Castro, who converted on a jump shot to give the Tropang Texters the lead, 83–77, with 2:16 left in the game. The Kings would not recover and they trailed the series, 3–1.

Game 5

Both teams figured in a low-scoring first half, with Ginebra holding a 39–38 lead. The Kings started the third quarter with a 9–0 run to extend their lead to ten; Castro scored five points in a 9–2 Talk 'N Text run to cut the lead to one, 58–57. Castro kept the Tropang Texters in the game, but Ginebra broke a 62–all deadlock with a run to lead 70–66 at the end of the third quarter. Castro scored nine more points but Ginebra kept the lead; with the Kings holding a 95–90 lead, the Tropang Texters turned over the ball, which led to a Mike Cortez three-point shot that gave Ginebra an unassailable 98–90 lead.

Game 6

Ginebra had an 81–65 lead early in the fourth quarter when Talk 'N Text had an 11–0 run as they cut the lead to four points with 5:35 left. Down by two points in the final seconds of the fourth quarter, Alapag drove to the basket and scored a lay-up to tie the game. On the ensuing possession, Labagala also drove to the basket but missed on a floater to send the game into overtime. De Ocampo, Alapag and Castro scored three-point shots to give the Tropang Texters the lead 97–93 when Wilson scored his own three-pointer to cut the lead to one point with 58.3 seconds left in overtime. After Alapag scored on two free throws, Caguioa missed on a difficult three-pointer and Willie Miller turned the ball over as time expired.

Alapag and Castro were named co-Finals MVPs for the second consecutive conference.

Rosters

Broadcast notes

References

External links
PBA official website

2010–11 PBA season
2011
TNT Tropang Giga games
Barangay Ginebra San Miguel games
PBA Commissioner's Cup Finals 2011
PBA Commissioner's Cup Finals
PBA Commissioner's Cup Finals